Mahesh is an Indian actor in Malayalam films and television serials. He came into the movie industry as a hero and later started doing negative roles and supporting roles.

Career
He started his career as an assistant director for the director J. Sasikumar in the early 1980s. Then he worked as an associate director for 16 Malayalam movies with different leading directors. Later he turned to the acting career. He first acted in the movie Mudra, directed by Sibi Malayil in 1989 at the age of 23. He went on to act in classic movies like Mrugaya, Sadayam Vyooham, etc. He took a break in the late 1999s and went to United States and settled there. He made a comeback in 2006 and directed a Malayalam movie in 2008; Calendar, with Prithviraj Sukumaran, Zarina Wahab and Navya Nair in the lead. He did story, screenplay and dialogue for the Malayalam movie Ashwaroodan. Currently he is active in direction for Malayalam films.

Personal life
He was born to P. K. Padmanabhan Nair and Padmakumari in Tanzania, though he originally hails from Trivandrum. His father was working for the British government in Tanzania, then he moved back to India in the early 1970s. They settled down in Alleppey near to Udaya Studio, which attracted him to the film industry. He had his primary education from St. Joseph's Higher Secondary School, Pulinkunnoo and graduation in Bcom from S.D.(Sanatana Dharma College), Alappuzha. His father died when he was eleven years old.

He is married to Hema. They have two daughters, Malavika and Meghna. He currently resides at Tripunithura. His elder daughter Malavika married Ajay Nair, a senior sub-editor for Sky news, on September 2021. They are settled in UK.

Filmography

As an actor

Malayalam

 Mrugaya (1989) as Thomaskutty
 Mudra (1989) as Babu
 News (1989) as Roy Jacob
 Shilpi (1989)
 Purappadu (1990)
 Commander (1990)
 Vyooham (1990) as Kishore
 Marupuram (1990) as Binoy's friend
 Ponnaranjaanam (1990) as Vinod
 Vembanaad (1990)
 Parallel College (1991) as Ashok
 Cheppukilukkana Changathi (1991)
 Kuttapathram (1991) as Mahesh
 Priyapetta Kukku (1992)
 Sadayam (1992)
 Chevaliyar Michael (1992)
 Soorya Chakram (1992)
 Neelakkurukkan (1992)
 Kaazhchaykkappuram (1992)
 Kakkatholaayiram (1992)
 Kasargod Kharder Bhai (1992)
 Uppukandam Brothers (1993)
 Padhavi (1993)
 Aacharyan (1993) as Jeevan Kumar
 City Police (1993) as Jayan
 Kambolam (1994)
 Ponthan Mada (1994)
 Sudhinam (1994) as School Manager
 Simhavaalan Menon (1994)
 Dollar (1994)
 Sukham Sukhakaram (1994)
 Njaan Kodeeshwaran (1994)
 Mimics Action 500 (1994)
 Special Squad (1995) as Martin
 Kidilol Kidilam (1995)
 Thirumanassu (1995)
 Minnaminuginum Minnukettu (1995)
 Tom & Jerry (1995)
 Man of the Match (1996)
 Mimics Super 1000 (1996)
 Sulthan Hyderali (1996)
 KL-7-95- Eranakulam North (1996)
 Kalyana Unnikal (1997) as Krishnanunni
 Moonukodiyum Munnurupavanum (1997)
 Poothumbiyum Poovalanmarum (1997)
 Irattakuttikalude Achan (1997)
 Oral Mathram (1997)
 Achamakuttiyude Achayan (1998)
 Gloria Fernandes From U.S.A. (1998)
 Auto Brothers (1999)
 Soothradharan (2001)
 Chakkara Muthu (2006)
 Malabar Wedding (2008)
 Best Friends (2008)
 Twenty:20 (2008) Video Archive
 Calendar (2009)
 Puthumukhangal (2010)
 Sakudumbam Shyamala (2010)
 Again Kasarkode Khaderbhai (2010) video archive
 Uppukandam Brothers Back in Action (2011) video archive
 Last Bench (2012)
 Masters (2012)
 101 weddings (2012)
 Face2Face (2012)
 Second Innings (2012)
 White Paper (2012)
 Maanthrikan (2012)
 Lokpal (2013)
 Omega.exe (2013)
 Geethaanjali (2013)
 The Dolphins (2014)
 Marubhoomiyile Aana (2016)
 Ore Mukham (2016)
 Kattappanayile Rithwik Roshan (2016)
 Honey Bee 2 (2017)
 Lakshyam (2017)
 Kala Viplavom Rashtreeyam (2017)
 Honey Bee 2.5 (2017)
 Angarajiyathile Ginmanmmaar (2017)
 Ayaal Jeevichirippundu (2017)
 Vallikudilile Vellakkaran (2018)
 Theater (2018)
 Wonder Boys (2018)
 Vikadakumaaran (2018)
 Janathipan (2019)
 Orma (2019)
 Janaathipan (2019)
 Oru Yemandan Premakatha (2019)
 Kottayam (2019)
 Ellom (2020)
 Upacharapoorvam Gunda Jayan (2022)
 Eesho (2022)
 Sheela (2022)
 Autorickshawkarante Bharya (2022)

Tamil
 Mohamul (1989)
 Ippadikku Kaadhil (1993)
 Reengaara Oosai (2016)
 Aruppukotti (2018) as Arjun
 Arram Aruvu (2022)

Hindi
 Jaal (1986)
 Galat Sambandh (1991)
 Shauqeen Haseena (1992)

Telugu
RX 100 (2018)

Story
Ashwaroodan (2007)
Calendar (2009)

Direction
Street Of Harmony (documentary) (2004)
Calendar (2009)
Paarkathonnume Unmayalli (2011)
Reengaara Oosai (Tamil) (2016)

Dialogue
Ashwaroodan (2007)

Screenplay
 Ashwaroodan (2007)
 Reengaara Oosai (2016)

Television

References

http://entertainment.oneindia.in/celebs/mahesh-malayalam-actor.html

External links

Mahesh at MSI

Male actors from Kerala
Male actors in Malayalam cinema
Indian male film actors
Living people
20th-century Indian male actors
21st-century Indian male actors
People from Kottayam district
Indian male television actors
Male actors in Malayalam television
Male actors in Tamil cinema
Male actors in Hindi cinema
21st-century Indian dramatists and playwrights
21st-century Indian film directors
Film directors from Kerala
Malayalam screenwriters
Year of birth missing (living people)
21st-century Indian screenwriters